Superior Software Ltd (also known as Superior Interactive) is a video game publisher. It was one of the main publishers for the BBC Micro and Acorn Electron computers in the 1980s and early 1990s. It currently releases games for Microsoft Windows, iOS and Android; mostly updates of its original games.

History 
Superior Software was established in 1982 by Richard Hanson and John Dyson, two graduates of the University of Leeds, England. They had previously programmed software published by Micro Power, and they wrote Superior's first four-game releases for the BBC Micro: three were written by Hanson and one by Dyson. Describing the early days, Hanson commented:

Superior mostly focused on the machines of Acorn Computers Ltd and also published software for other platforms including the Oric-1 and Commodore 64. Key management personnel have included Steve Botterill, Chris Payne and Steve Hanson.

Major software developers Peter Johnson, Tim Tyler, Martin Edmondson, Nicholas Chamberlain, Kevin Edwards, David Hoskins, Matthew Atkinson, Chris Roberts, Tony Oakden, Peter Scott, Gary Partis, Peter Irvin, Jeremy Smith, David Braben, Ian Bell, Geoff Crammond, Jonathan Griffiths and Nick Pelling have all produced software published by Superior, sometimes released under the joint Superior Software / Acornsoft brandname.

Releases 

Their best-known games are the Repton series of games, which have sold over 125,000 units in total. Other notable Superior Software games for the BBC Micro and Acorn Electron include Overdrive, Citadel, Thrust, Galaforce, Stryker's Run, Ravenskull, Codename: Droid (sequel to Stryker's Run), Palace of Magic, Bonecruncher, Quest, Pipeline, Exile and  Ricochet. They also published the seminal Zarch for the Acorn Archimedes, as well as follow-up games using the same engine, Conqueror and Air Supremacy.

As well as their high quality original games, Superior released a number of official Acorn conversions of big games from other systems including Barbarian, The Last Ninja, Predator, Hostages and Sim City.

Superior also published a number of educational and utility software titles including the speech synthesis program Speech!.

The "Play It Again Sam" series of compilations included re-releases of their old titles, with four games for the usual price of one. The original Play It Again Sam featured four Superior games which had each made No. 1 individually (Citadel, Thrust, Ravenskull, and Stryker's Run), while subsequent compilations increasingly featured games licensed from other software houses such as Micro Power or Alligata. These compilations also occasionally included some new games that were thought to be not quite up to the standard of their full price games. The series eventually ran to 18 issues for the BBC Micro, although the latest ones were released on disc only, well into the demise of the 8-bit scene with lower sales as a result.

Superior, under the brandname Superior Interactive, now mainly develops and publishes software for computers and devices running Microsoft Windows, iOS and Android; and they have released several updated versions of some of their popular 1980s hits for these systems. This includes the original three Repton games, additional Repton levels, Galaforce Worlds, Ravenskull, Pipeline Plus and Ricochet.

See also
Acornsoft

References

External links
 Superior Interactive website
 Superior Interactive profile from MobyGames

 
Video game companies of the United Kingdom
Video game publishers
Acorn Computers
RISC OS
Video game companies established in 1982
1982 establishments in England